Classless Inter-Domain Routing (CIDR ) is a method for allocating IP addresses and for IP routing. The Internet Engineering Task Force introduced CIDR in 1993 to replace the previous classful network addressing architecture on the Internet. Its goal was to slow the growth of routing tables on routers across the Internet, and to help slow the rapid exhaustion of IPv4 addresses.

IP addresses are described as consisting of two groups of bits in the address: the most significant bits are the network prefix, which identifies a whole network or subnet, and the least significant set forms the host identifier, which specifies a particular interface of a host on that network. This division is used as the basis of traffic routing between IP networks and for address allocation policies.

Whereas classful network design for IPv4 sized the network prefix as one or more 8-bit groups, resulting in the blocks of Class A, B, or C addresses, under CIDR address space is allocated to Internet service providers and end users on any address-bit boundary. In IPv6, however, the interface identifier has a fixed size of 64 bits by convention, and smaller subnets are never allocated to end users.

CIDR is based on variable-length subnet masking (VLSM), in which network prefixes have variable length (as opposed to the fixed-length prefixing of the previous classful network design). The main benefit of this is that it grants finer control of the sizes of subnets allocated to organizations, hence slowing the exhaustion of IPv4 addresses from allocating larger subnets than needed. CIDR gave rise to a new way of writing IP addresses known as CIDR notation, in which an IP address is followed by a suffix indicating the number of bits of the prefix. Blocks of addresses having contiguous prefixes may be aggregated as supernets, reducing the number of entries in the global routing table.

Background
Each IP address consists of a network-identifying prefix followed by a host identifier.  The question is how many bits of the address are in the network prefix, and how many are in the host identifier.  In the previous IPv4 classful network architecture, the top three bits of the 32-bit IP address defined how many bits were in the network prefix:

The advantage of this system is that the network prefix could be determined for any IP address without any further information.  The disadvantage is that because only three sizes are available, networks were usually too big or too small for most organizations to use.  The smallest allocation and routing block contained 28 = 256 addresses — larger than necessary for personal or department networks, but too small for most enterprises.  The next larger block contained 216 =  addresses—too large to be used efficiently even by large organizations.  But for network users who needed more than  addresses, the only other size (224) gave them far too many, more than 16 million.  This led to inefficiencies in address use as well as inefficiencies in routing, because it required a large number of allocated class-C networks with individual route announcements, being geographically dispersed with little opportunity for route aggregation.

Within a decade after the invention of the Domain Name System (DNS), it became apparent that the old classful network scheme was not scalable. This led to the development of subnetting and CIDR. The formerly meaningful class distinctions based on the top 3 address bits were removed, and the new system was described as being classless, in contrast to the old system, which became known as classful. Routing protocols were revised to carry not just IP addresses, but also their matching subnet masks. Implementing CIDR required every host and router on the Internet to be reprogrammed in small ways—no small feat at a time when the Internet was entering a period of rapid growth. An updated version, was published in 2006.
After a period of experimentation with various alternatives, Classless Inter-Domain Routing was based on variable-length subnet masking (VLSM), which allows each network to be divided into various power-of-two-sized subnets, so that each network or subnet can be sized appropriately for local needs. Techniques for grouping addresses for common operations were based on the concept of cluster addressing, first proposed by Carl-Herbert Rokitansky.

CIDR notation
CIDR notation is a compact representation of an IP address and its associated network mask. The notation was invented by Phil Karn in the 1980s.  CIDR notation specifies an IP address, a slash ('/') character, and a decimal number. The decimal number is the count of consecutive leading 1-bits (from left to right) in the network mask.  The number can also be thought of as the width (in bits) of the network prefix.  The IP address in CIDR notation is always represented according to the standards for IPv4 or IPv6.

For example:
  represents the IPv4 address  and its associated network prefix , or equivalently, its subnet mask , which has 24 leading 1-bits.
  represents the IPv6 loopback address. Its prefix length is 128 which is the number of bits in the address.

In IPv4, what is now called CIDR notation came into wide use only after the implementation of CIDR.  It does not appear in the original CIDR standards, which instead used a dotted-decimal subnet mask after the slash; for example, .  Describing the network prefix's width as a single number was easier for network administrators to conceptualize and to mentally calculate, so it gradually became incorporated into later standards documents and into network configuration interfaces.

The number of addresses inside a network or subnet may be calculated as 2address length − prefix length, where address length is 128 for IPv6 and 32 for IPv4. For example, in IPv4, the prefix length  gives: 232−29 = 23 = 8 addresses.

Subnet masks
A subnet mask is a bitmask that encodes the prefix length associated with an IPv4 address or network in quad-dotted notation: 32 bits, starting with a number of 1-bits equal to the prefix length, ending with 0-bits, and encoded in four-part dotted-decimal format: . A subnet mask encodes the same information as a prefix length but predates the advent of CIDR. In CIDR notation, the prefix bits are always contiguous. Given this constraint, a subnet mask and CIDR notation serve exactly the same function.

CIDR blocks
CIDR is principally a bitwise, prefix-based standard for the representation of IP addresses and their routing properties. It facilitates routing by allowing blocks of addresses to be grouped into single routing table entries. These groups, commonly called CIDR blocks, share an initial sequence of bits in the binary representation of their IP addresses. IPv4 CIDR blocks are identified using a syntax similar to that of IPv4 addresses: a dotted-decimal address, followed by a slash, then a number from 0 to 32, i.e., . The dotted decimal portion is the IPv4 address. The number following the slash is the prefix length, the number of shared initial bits, counting from the most-significant bit of the address. When emphasizing only the size of a network, the address portion of the notation is usually omitted. Thus, a /20 block is a CIDR block with an unspecified 20-bit prefix.

An IP address is part of a CIDR block and is said to match the CIDR prefix if the initial n bits of the address and the CIDR prefix are the same. An IPv4 address is 32 bits so an n-bit CIDR prefix leaves 32 − n bits unmatched, meaning that 232−n IPv4 addresses match a given n-bit CIDR prefix. Shorter CIDR prefixes match more addresses, while longer prefixes match fewer. In the case of overlaid CIDR blocks, an address can match multiple CIDR prefixes of different lengths.

CIDR is also used for IPv6 addresses and the syntax semantic is identical. The prefix length can range from 0 to 128, due to the larger number of bits in the address. However, by convention, a subnet on broadcast MAC layer networks always has 64-bit host identifiers. Larger prefixes (/127) are only used on some point-to-point links between routers, for security and policy reasons.

Assignment of CIDR blocks
The Internet Assigned Numbers Authority (IANA) issues to regional Internet registries (RIRs) large, short-prefix CIDR blocks. For example,  is administered by RIPE NCC, the European RIR. The RIRs, each responsible for a single, large, geographic area, such as Europe or North America, subdivide these blocks and allocate subnets to local Internet registries (LIRs). Similar subdividing may be repeated several times at lower levels of delegation. End-user networks receive subnets sized according to their projected short-term need. Networks served by a single ISP are encouraged by IETF recommendations to obtain IP address space directly from their ISP. Networks served by multiple ISPs, on the other hand, may obtain provider-independent address space directly from the appropriate RIR.

For example, in the late 1990s, the IP address  (since reassigned) was used by www.freesoft.org. An analysis of this address identified three CIDR prefixes. , a large CIDR block containing over 2 million addresses, had been assigned by ARIN (the North American RIR) to MCI. Automation Research Systems (ARS), a Virginia VAR, leased an Internet connection from MCI and was assigned the  block, capable of addressing just over 1000 devices. All of these CIDR prefixes would be used, at different locations in the network. Within MCI's network,  would become visible, directing traffic to the leased line serving ARS. Only within the ARS corporate network would the  prefix have been used.

IPv4 CIDR blocks

In common usage, the first address in a subnet, all binary zero in the host identifier, is reserved for referring to the network itself, while the last address, all binary one in the host identifier, is used as a broadcast address for the network; this reduces the number of addresses available for hosts by 2.  As a result, a  network, with one binary digit in the host identifier, would be unusable, as such a subnet would provide no available host addresses after this reduction.  creates an exception to the "host all ones" and "host all zeros" rules to make  networks usable for point-to-point links.  addresses (single-host network) must be accessed by explicit routing rules, as there is no room in such a network for a gateway.

IPv6 CIDR blocks

The large address size used in IPv6 permitted implementation of worldwide route summarization and guaranteed sufficient address pools at each site. The standard subnet size for IPv6 networks is a  block, which is required for the operation of stateless address autoconfiguration.

This IPv6 subnetting reference lists the sizes for IPv6 subnetworks. Different types of network links may require different subnet sizes. The subnet mask separates the bits of the network identifier prefix from the bits of the interface identifier. Selecting a smaller prefix size results in fewer number of networks covered, but with more addresses within each network.

 2001:0db8:0123:4567:89ab:cdef:1234:5678
 |||| |||| |||| |||| |||| |||| |||| ||||
 |||| |||| |||| |||| |||| |||| |||| |||128     Single end-points and loopback
 |||| |||| |||| |||| |||| |||| |||| |||127   Point-to-point links (inter-router)
 |||| |||| |||| |||| |||| |||| |||| ||124
 |||| |||| |||| |||| |||| |||| |||| |120
 |||| |||| |||| |||| |||| |||| |||| 116
 |||| |||| |||| |||| |||| |||| |||112
 |||| |||| |||| |||| |||| |||| ||108
 |||| |||| |||| |||| |||| |||| |104
 |||| |||| |||| |||| |||| |||| 100
 |||| |||| |||| |||| |||| |||96
 |||| |||| |||| |||| |||| ||92
 |||| |||| |||| |||| |||| |88
 |||| |||| |||| |||| |||| 84
 |||| |||| |||| |||| |||80
 |||| |||| |||| |||| ||76
 |||| |||| |||| |||| |72
 |||| |||| |||| |||| 68
 |||| |||| |||| |||64   Single LAN; default prefix size for SLAAC
 |||| |||| |||| ||60   Some (very limited) 6rd deployments (/60 = 16 /64 blocks)
 |||| |||| |||| |56   Minimal end sites assignment; e.g. home network (/56 = 256 /64 blocks)
 |||| |||| |||| 52   /52 block = 4096 /64 blocks
 |||| |||| |||48   Typical assignment for larger sites (/48 = 65536 /64 blocks)
 |||| |||| ||44
 |||| |||| |40
 |||| |||| 36   possible future local Internet registry (LIR) extra-small allocations
 |||| |||32   LIR minimum allocations
 |||| ||28   LIR medium allocations
 |||| |24   LIR large allocations
 |||| 20   LIR extra large allocations
 |||16
 ||12   Regional Internet registry (RIR) allocations from IANA
 |8
 4

Prefix aggregation
CIDR provides fine-grained routing prefix aggregation. For example, if the first 20 bits of their network prefixes match, sixteen contiguous  networks can be aggregated and advertised to a larger network as a single  routing table entry. This reduces the number of routes that have to be advertised.

See also
 Internet protocol suite

References

Further reading

External links
 CIDR Report (updated daily)

Internet Standards
Internet architecture
Routing
IP addresses

it:Supernetting#CIDR